The 2003 WCHA Men's Ice Hockey Tournament was the 44th conference playoff in league history and 49th season where a WCHA champion was crowned. The 2003 tournament was played between March 14 and March 22, 2003, at five conference arenas and the Xcel Energy Center in St. Paul, Minnesota. By winning the tournament, Minnesota was awarded the Broadmoor Trophy and received the Western Collegiate Hockey Association's automatic bid to the NCAA Tournament.

Format
The first round of the postseason tournament featured a best-of-three games format. All ten conference schools participated in the tournament with teams seeded No. 1 through No. 10 according to their final conference standing, with a tiebreaker system used to seed teams with an identical number of points accumulated. The top five seeded teams each earned home ice and hosted one of the lower seeded teams.

The winners of the first round series advanced to the Xcel Energy Center for the WCHA Final Five, the collective name for the quarterfinal, semifinal, and championship rounds. The Final Five uses a single-elimination format. Teams were re-seeded No. 1 through No. 5 according to the final regular season conference standings, with the top three teams automatically advancing to the semifinals.

Conference standings
Note: PTS = Points; GP = Games played; W = Wins; L = Losses; T = Ties; GF = Goals For; GA = Goals Against

Bracket
Teams are reseeded after the first round

Note: * denotes overtime period(s)

First round

(1) Colorado College vs. (10) Alaska-Anchorage

(2) Minnesota vs. (9) Michigan Tech

(3) Minnesota State-Mankato vs. (8) Wisconsin

(4) North Dakota vs. (7) Denver

(5) Minnesota-Duluth vs. (6) St. Cloud State

Quarterfinal

(4) North Dakota vs. (5) Minnesota-Duluth

Semifinals

(1) Colorado College vs. (5) Minnesota-Duluth

(2) Minnesota vs. (3) Minnesota State-Mankato

Third Place

(3) Minnesota State-Mankato vs. (5) Minnesota-Duluth

Championship

(1) Colorado College vs. (2) Minnesota

Tournament awards

All-Tournament Team
F Grant Potulny* (Minnesota)
F Junior Lessard (Minnesota-Duluth)
F Shane Joseph (Minnesota State-Mankato)
D Tom Preissing (Colorado College)
D Keith Ballard (Minnesota)
G Justin Johnson (Minnesota)
* Most Valuable Player(s)

Tournament Three Stars
3 Justin Johnson (Minnesota)
2 Peter Sejna (Colorado College)
1 Grant Potulny (Minnesota)

See also
Western Collegiate Hockey Association men's champions

References

External links
WCHA official site 
2002–03 WCHA Standings
2002–03 NCAA Standings

WCHA Men's Ice Hockey Tournament
WCHA Men's Ice Hockey Tournament